Çalışlar is a quarter of the town Güney, Sinanpaşa District, Afyonkarahisar Province, Turkey. Its population is 243 (2021).

References

Populated places in Sinanpaşa District